Wells Township is a township in Marshall County, Kansas, in the United States.

History
Wells Township was named for John D. Wells, a first settler.

References

Townships in Marshall County, Kansas
Townships in Kansas